The 2019 Columbus mayoral election took place on November 5, 2019, to elect the Mayor of Columbus, Ohio. The election was officially nonpartisan. Since there were fewer than three candidates, no primary was necessary.

Incumbent mayor Andrew Ginther ran unopposed for reelection to a second term. However, write-in votes were allowed.

Results

References

Mayoral elections in Columbus, Ohio
2019 Ohio elections
Columbus